Karate Klub Partizan is a karate club from Belgrade, Serbia. The club is part of the sports society JSD Partizan.

There are two main trainers for the club - Milos Zivkovic and Aleksandra Lazic .

The club in Belgrade trains at the Partizan Stadium. 
The leader of the Serbian Political Party Srpsko Jedinstvo used to train in Karate Klub Partizan.

Brief history
Karate started to develop in the former Yugoslavia in the 1960s. Some of the first sensei's from Japan to come over were Nagaoka Skokiči and Tecuji Murakami. Karate Klub Partizan was among the first Karate Clubs that were formed in the former Yugoslavia. Initially being together with the Judo federation, Karate separated into its own federation in 1969. The main style of Karate that was trained was Shotokan, while Vadorju was also present in a few clubs.

Honours

Men
Championship of Serbia
Winners (1) : 2012
European Championship
Winners (2) : 2000, 2001
Runners-up (1) : 2002

Women
 Championship of Yugoslavia
Winners (4)
Championship of Serbia
Winners (2) : 2011, 2018

References

External links
Official Website - note: currently it is down

Sport in Belgrade